Lake Ellsworth is a lake in Caddo and Comanche counties in the state of Oklahoma in the United States. It was built by the City of Lawton, Oklahoma  in 1962, primarily to serve as a water supply source for Lawton and the surrounding area. The nearest community is Elgin, Oklahoma.

Description
Lake Ellsworth has a stream source from East Cache Creek,  of shoreline, and encompasses . The normal capacity is

Recreation
Recreational activities allowed include fishing, wakeboarding, water skiing and jet skiing. Swimming is allowed in most of the lake, except near the dam, boat ramps and the boathouse. However, swimming is at the visitor's own risk, since there are no lifeguards. Fishing and camping facilities are maintained by the City of Lawton, Oklahoma.

Several species of fish live in the lake, including channel catfish, crappie, flathead catfish, largemouth bass, saugeye, sunfish, walleye and white bass. In 1999, a fisherman caught an 85-pound, 4-ounce Blue Catfish, which was the state record for that species at the time.

See also
 Cache Creek
 List of lakes in Oklahoma
 Wichita Mountains
 Wichita Mountains Wildlife Refuge

References

External links
 
 
 
 Oklahoma Digital Maps: Digital Collections of Oklahoma and Indian Territory

Ellsworth
Bodies of water of Caddo County, Oklahoma
Bodies of water of Comanche County, Oklahoma
Infrastructure completed in 1962